Magallanes, officially the Municipality of Magallanes,  is a 4th class municipality in the province of Agusan del Norte, Philippines. According to the 2020 census, it has a population of 22,293 people.

The municipality was named after the Hispanized surname of the Portuguese-born maritime explorer Ferdinand Magellan. Formerly part of Butuan, Magallanes was created as a municipality on June 21, 1969, through Republic Act 5660.

Geography
According to the Philippine Statistics Authority, the municipality has a land area of  constituting  of the  total area of Agusan del Norte.

The topography of the land is mostly flat and rolling, surrounded by mountains. Swamps characterize much of the landscape that is situated at the mouth of the two major rivers in the province, the Agusan and Baug Rivers.

The town center is in the river delta and has to be kept protected by dikes.

Around  of Magallanes lands have slope of 0 to 3 percent,  have 8 to 18 percent,  18 to 30 percent and  30 to 50 percent.

Hydrosol, San Miguel Loam, San Miguel Clay Loam, Malalag Silt Loam and Butuan Loam are its soil types. Upper Miocene, Cretaceous-Paleogene and recent sedimentary materials are the rock elements that make up Magallanes lands.

Land use
Of its total land area,  are classified as alienable and disposable. The other  are forestlands.  or 3 percent is built-up,  of that for social facilities and the other  for roads. Around  or 64.33 percent of its lands are utilized for agriculture, the other  or 33.20 percent, for forest use. Four hectares are also being utilized for tourism in special use. Within the agricultural area,  are under CARP coverage.

Climate

Magallanes is generally outside the "typhoon belt". Its climate is, by Philippine classification, Type II. There is no definite dry season in the area. Maximum rain is from November to January. Lying within the eastern coast, the place is within the pathway north-east monsoons, trade winds and storms.

Barangays
Magallanes is politically subdivided into eight barangays.

Demographics

In the 2020 census, Magallanes had a population of 22,293.

Economy

The town has two plywood manufacturing firms: EMCO (Barangay Santo Rosario) and PSPI (Barangay Marcos), and one safety matches manufacturing firm: JAKA Equities Corp (Barangay Marcos). The three manufacturing plants are all on the main street and operating near the Baug River and Agusan River.

A  of prawn/shrimp farm in Magallanes used to be the Philippines' top exporter of first class prawn/shrimp to Japan, until the entire farm was hit by a white spot disease in 2001 leading to the collapse of the industry.

Tourism

Philippine Centennial Tree The Department of Environment and Natural Resources (DENR) awarded Magallanes as the place that host the Oldest Tree (more than 500 years old) in the Philippines called Bitaug.

Lisagan Festival Magallanes celebrates its annual fiesta every third Saturday of October in honor of patroness Nuestra Señora del Rosario, Our Lady of the Rosary, which includes thanksgiving mass, parades and more. 
The 'Lisagan Festival' held on Sunday after the fiesta includes street dancing similar to Sinulog Festival and fluvial procession at the Agusan River and Baug River. The town parish doesn't allow major public gathering like disco, live bands and other similar events the night before the fiesta.

Magellan Shrine Located at Poblacion near the Municipal Hall, the shrine was the site of the 'first' Catholic mass in Mindanao on April 8, 1521. It was believed that the Magellan's Cross in Cebu was also erected here by the explorer Ferdinand Magellan and his men before they sail North. Evidence showed church ruins near the Agusan River.

Agusan River The Agusan River is the widest and navigable river in Mindanao.

Government

List of mayors

Infrastructure

The Magallanes Coastal Road (Known as Cuenca Avenue Street) was started on 2019 under municipal mayor Cesar Cumba, Jr. The said project was under the Local Government and it was completed in October 2020. The REBAR Sports Center was located in P-6 Buhang, Magallanes which was opened on October 9, 2020. The said sports center was owned and maintained by the private family, and it has 2 badminton courts, 2 table tennis courts, 2 darts courts, and the taekwondo dojang.

Communications
The Philippine Long Distance Telephone Company provides fixed line services. Wireless mobile communications services are provided by Smart Communications and Globe Telecommunications.

Transportation
Magallanes can be reached through the Mindanao gateways:

Air
 Bancasi Airport of Butuan and Laguindingan International Airport of Cagayan de Oro and Iligan
 PAL Express and Cebu Pacific have daily flights from Manila to Butuan and v.v. Cebu-Butuan-Cebu flights via Cebu Pacific scheduled Mondays, Wednesdays and Saturdays, and PAL.

Sea
 Masao Port of Butuan
 Port of Nasipit
 Port of Surigao
 Macabalan Port of Cagayan de Oro

There are several major shipping lines serving the Manila and Cebu routes namely: 2Go, Cokaliong, Medallion Transport and PSACC.

The boat ride from Butuan to Magallanes, navigating the Agusan River, takes about 45 minutes.

Land
Bachelor Express and PhilTranCo is the dominant public land transport from Manila and Tacloban passing Surigao, Cabadbaran and Butuan to Cagayan de Oro and Davao. The public mode of transportation within the municipality is by motorcabs and pedicabs. Passenger vans commonly known as V-Hire are also available for Butuan routes.

References

External links

 [ Philippine Standard Geographic Code]
 
 Agusan del Norte Tourism - Explore Magallanes

Municipalities of Agusan del Norte